The Dr Sun Yat-sen Museum is a museum in Central, Hong Kong. It is located in Kom Tong Hall, at 7 Castle Road, Central. After the preparation work undertaken by the Hong Kong Museum of History, the museum was opened on 12 December 2006, so as to commemorate the 140th birthday of the influential Chinese statesman.

Introduction
Dr Sun Yat-sen received worldwide reputation as a great revolutionary and his epoch-making career was inseparable from Hong Kong, where he attended schools and nurtured his revolutionary ideas.

From the establishment of the Xing Zhong Hui (Revive China Society) in 1894 to the founding of the Chinese Republic in 1912, Dr Sun used Hong Kong as a base of his revolutionary campaign.

His activities mainly focused in the Central and Western District, including the College of Medicine for Chinese at 81 Hollywood Road where he received his tertiary education, and Qian Heng Hang at 13 Staunton Street where he set up the headquarters of the Xing Zhong Hui.

As the district records Dr Sun's activities and covers the Sun Yat-sen Historical Trail, the Hong Kong SAR Government selected and acquired Kom Tong Hall at 7 Castle Road as the venue of the proposed Dr Sun Yat-sen Museum.

History of Kom Tong Hall
Kom Tong Hall is a historic building at Mid Levels, Central. It was accorded a Grade II historic building status in 1990 by the Antiquities Advisory Board (AAB). It was later declared a monument.

The Hall was built in 1914. It was named after the former owner of the Mansion, Ho Kom-tong, who was a younger brother of the prominent philanthropist Sir Robert Ho Tung. The Ho family was the first Chinese family permitted to live in the Mid Levels in the early colonial period.

In 1960, the Church of Jesus Christ of Latter-day Saints purchased the building.  The Church used the Hall for worship services and other local Church activities as well as for administration of its Asia-area humanitarian, building and other programs. As a result of Church growth, locally and throughout Asia over the last four decades, the Church's headquarters were moved out of Kom Tong Hall and into a much larger new 14-story building on Gloucester Road in Wan Chai, Hong Kong.

The Church no longer had need for the building and was looking to sell the property.  It soon became apparent that a vacant lot would yield a far higher amount than if the property were sold intact, and the Church considered demolishing the building. In October 2002, the Church submitted an application for a demolition permit to the Building Authority.  However, after hearing concerns raised by friends in the community, and a series of negotiations with the Hong Kong Government, Church officials reached a consensus in selling the property intact and preserving the building.

After the Government completed the purchase in 2004, efforts began immediately to convert the 92-year-old historic mansion into a museum honoring Chinese revolutionary figure Dr Sun Yat-Sen.  The converted museum was officially opened on 12 December 2006.

As a sign of appreciation from the government to The Church of Jesus Christ of Latter-Day Saints, Dr Patrick Ho, Secretary for Home Affairs, arranged for the baptismal font to be preserved as a reminder to museum visitors of the Church's 44-year part in the building's history. In addition, a plaque on the front of the building displays the following:

"The Kom Tong Hall was the Hong Kong Headquarters of The Church of Jesus Christ of Latter-day Saints from 1960 to 2004. It was well preserved, leaving behind a cultural legacy that has been made available to the people of Hong Kong."

The retrofitted Hall has been made compatible with the Sun Yat-sen Historical Trail in its vicinity and lets the general public reminisce the activities of Dr Sun and his revolutionary comrades in their heyday.

Relationship between Dr Sun and Kom Tong Hall
Dr Sun had not set foot at Kom Tong Hall throughout his life, but he was related to Ho Kom Tong, the original owner of the premises, in other ways.

Both were born in 1866 and were the graduates of the Central School, the present Queen's College, in 1886. Being schoolmates, it was not surprising that Dr Sun and Ho Kom Tong were acquaintances. Ho's elder brother, Sir Robert Ho Tung, even rendered support towards Dr Sun's revolutionary activities.

Ironically though, Ho Kom Tong was in fact, like his elder brother Sir Robert Ho Tung before him, a compradore of Jardine Matheson.  The firm had once dominated the opium trade and its director, William Jardine, had been instrumental in the British Parliament launching the Opium War against China.  The firm had given up opium in the 1860s due to its declining profitability, which was well before Ho Kom Tong became involved with the firm.  However, Jardine Matheson was still very much a symbol of British commercial penetration into China in an era of high imperial ambition.  Jardine's involvement, for instance, in the Kowloon-Canton Railway, a project designed to bring Canton into Britain's sphere of influence, was very much at cross purposes with the nationalist ideals of Dr Sun, who very much wanted to maintain the territorial integrity of China.

When Dr Sun left Shanghai for Guangzhou via Hong Kong, he called at Ho Tung's house on 18 February 1923. Two days later, Dr Sun was accompanied by Ho Tung to Loke Yew Hall at the University of Hong Kong, where he was warmly received by the representatives of the university, including Ho Sai Kim, son of Ho Tung and chairman of the university's student union. Ho Sai Kim even sat beside Dr Sun while a group photograph was taken after the function.

Given the close relations between Ho's family and Dr Sun Yat-sen, Kom Tong Hall is inevitably one of the most suitable venues for the setting up of a Dr Sun Museum.

Architecture
At this three-storey premises, the facade of the top two floors is supported by the Greek-style granite columns surrounding the curved balconies.

Inside the premises are two flights of staircases, with the one at the front for use by the Ho's family and the one at the back for mui tsai, literally maids. Being a typical Edwardian classical building, Kom Tong Hall is majestic and magnificent, and is among the very few surviving structures in Hong Kong, dating back to the early 20th century. The stained-glass windows, veranda wall tiles and staircase railings are all preserved intact.

Relics and artifacts on display
Relics and artifacts on display include Kwan King-leung's marriage certificate bearing Dr Sun's name as a witness, and a seal of "Long Live the Republic of China".

Other important relics include accessories from Dr Sun's early years, an announcement of the election results of his provisional presidency, the imperial edict of Emperor Xuantong's abdication, and Dr Sun's inscription to Huang Xing.

Several items are being showcased for the first time in years, such as Dr Sun's answer sheet for an examination in the Hong Kong College of Medicine for Chinese, a dinner menu from the college's graduation ceremony, and a reply to Dr Sun from the banished Hong Kong Colonial Secretary Stewart Lockhart.

Other facilities
The museum has an exhibition and lecture hall, reading room, video rooms, interactive study rooms and an activity room. It also provides audio guides, school lectures, educational DVDs and travelling exhibition panels.

The museum also offers electronic guides in Cantonese, Mandarin and English.

Transportation
The museum is accessible within walking distance South from Sheung Wan station of the MTR.

See also
 Dr Sun Yat-sen Historical Trail, near the museum 
 Sun Yat Sen Memorial Park, Hong Kong
 Hung Lau, Hong Kong
 National Sun Yat-sen Memorial Hall, Taipei
 List of museums in Hong Kong
 Tourism in Hong Kong

References

External links

Official website
Hong Kong Museum of History - Leisure and Cultural Services Department

Central, Hong Kong
Declared monuments of Hong Kong
History museums in Hong Kong
Former Latter Day Saint religious buildings and structures
Sun Yat-sen museums